Christmas Interpretations is the first Christmas album and second overall studio album by American R&B group Boyz II Men. It was released on October 5, 1993, by Motown. Several of the tracks are originals, written by Boyz II Men with labelmate and longtime friend Brian McKnight; others are traditional Christmas songs.

Critical reception

AllMusic editor Jose F. Promis described the album as "a cozy, velvety, and hip quiet storm Christmas album with touches of jazz, nostalgia, and melancholy but, at times, one yearns to hear the Boyz' lush harmonies wrapped around traditional favorites." Entertainment Weekly critic David Browne wrote that Boyz II Men "lusciously harmonize on Christmas Interpretations. With the exception of "Silent Night," the album consists entirely of new songs, most with mournful seasonal themes. It's a pretty gutsy move, but hampered by the fact that none of the originals are as memorable as, say, "Silent Night"."

Chart performance
Christmas Interpretations peaked at number 19 in the US Billboard 200. The album had sold 1,767,000 copies by December 2012.

Track listing 

Notes
  signifies a co-producer

Charts

Weekly charts

Year-end charts

Certifications

References

Boyz II Men albums
Motown albums
1993 Christmas albums
Albums produced by Brian McKnight
Christmas albums by American artists
Contemporary R&B Christmas albums